Giant-cell fibroma is a type of fibroma not associated with trauma or irritation. It can occur at any age and on a mucous membrane surface. The most common oral locations are on the gingiva of the mandible, tongue, and palate. It is a localized reactive proliferation of fibrous connective tissue.

Giant-cell fibroma (GCF) is a benign non-neoplastic lesion first described by Weathers and Callihan (1974). It occurs in the first three decades of life and predominates in females (Houston, 1982; Bakos, 1992). Clinically, the GCF presents as an asymptomatic, papillary and pedunculated lesion. The most predominant location is the mandibular gingiva (Houston, 1982; Bakos, 1992). Histologically, the GCF is distinctive, consisting of fibrous connective tissue without inflammation and covered with stratified squamous hyperplastic epithelium. The most characteristic histological feature is the presence of large spindle-shaped and stellate-shaped mononuclear cells and multinucleated cells. These cells occur in a variety of lesions, such as the fibrous papule of the nose, ungual fibroma, acral fibrokeratoma, acral angiofibroma and desmoplastic fibroblastoma (Swan, 1988; Pitt et al., 1993; Karabela-Bouropoulou et al., 1999; Jang et al., 1999). 
Despite many studies, the nature of the stellated multinucleate and mononuclear cell is not clear (Weathers and Campbell, 1974; Regezi et al., 1987; Odell et al., 1994; Magnusson and Rasmusson, 1995).

Diagnosis
PCNA and Ki67 immunoreactivity happens in case of fibroma and peripheral granuloma.

References

 Kahn, Michael A. Basic Oral and Maxillofacial Pathology. Volume 1. 2001.

Oral neoplasia